Genome Medicine is a peer-reviewed open-access medical journal with a focus on medical genetics. It was established in 2009 as a companion journal to Genome Biology and is published continuously by BioMed Central. The editor-in-chief is Rabia Begum.

Sections
The journal comprises six sections: 1) Genomics & epigenomics of disease, 2) Pharmacogenomics & personalized medicine, 3) Genomic epidemiology & public health genomics, 4) Proteomics & metabolomics in medicine, 5) Systems medicine & informatics, and 6) Ethical, legal & social issues, each with a dedicated editor.

Abstracting and indexing
The journal is abstracted and indexed in:
BIOSIS Previews
Chemical Abstracts Service
Index Medicus/MEDLINE/PubMed
Science Citation Index Expanded
Scopus
According to the Journal Citation Reports, the journal has a 2017 impact factor of 8.898.

References

External links

Genetics in the United Kingdom
Medical genetics journals
BioMed Central academic journals
Online-only journals
Publications established in 2009
English-language journals